The 1981 Boston College Eagles football team represented Boston College as an independent during the 1981 NCAA Division I-A football season. In its first season under head coach Jack Bicknell, the team compiled a 5–6 record and was outscored by a combined total of 298 to 243. Three of the team's losses were to teams then ranked among the top 10 in the AP Poll.

The team was led by freshman quarterback Doug Flutie who completed 105 of 192 passes for 1,652 passing yards, 10 touchdowns and eight interceptions.  Other statistical leaders included Leo Smith with 403 rushing yards, Brian Brennan with 726 receiving yards, kicker John Cooper with 55 points scored (28 extra points and 9 field goals), and defensive back George Radachowsky with seven interceptions. Flutie, Brennan, and Radachowsky all went on to play in the National Football League.

The team played its home games at Alumni Stadium in Chestnut Hill, Massachusetts.

Schedule

Roster

References

Boston College
Boston College Eagles football seasons
Boston College Eagles football
Boston College Eagles football